Ballyhale Shamrocks is a Gaelic Athletic Association club located in the parish of Ballyhale in County Kilkenny, Republic of Ireland.  The club was founded in 1972 and is primarily concerned with the game of hurling. Ballyhale Shamrocks are the most successful club in the history of the All-Ireland Senior Club Hurling Championship with nine titles.

Hurling

History

Beginnings
Gaelic Games had been played in the parish of Ballyhale long before the Shamrocks club was established.  By the early 1970s there were two competing clubs in existence in the parish, Ballyhale and Knocktopher, however, they were both facing extinction.  A third club, Knockmoylan, had ceased to exist at some time in 1959. Because of the situation facing both clubs they decided to amalgamate in 1972 under the new name of Ballyhale Shamrocks. The club adopted as its logo a three-leaf shamrock with the letters K, B and K, representing the three clubs that had existed in the parish, inserted on each leaf. The Ballyhale Shamrocks colours are green and white.
Success for the new Shamrocks club was instant.  The club won the Kilkenny Junior Hurling Championship in 1973 before claiming the Kilkenny Intermediate Hurling Championship title in 1974, a victory which allowed Ballyhale Shamrocks to play in the Kilkenny Senior Hurling Championship.

Early successes
Four years after joining the senior grade, Ballyhale Shamrocks reached the final of the county senior championship in 1978.  It was a great occasion for a club that was only founded six years earlier.  On that occasion the Fenians club, the reigning champions, provided the opposition.  After an interesting hour of hurling Ballyhale were the winners by 0–15 to 0–10, allowing them to take their first county title at senior level.  This victory also allowed the club to represent Kilkenny in the Leinster Senior Club Hurling Championship series of games.  The fairytale continued for Ballyhale as they reached the final of that competition where they defeated Dublin champions Crumlin.  A 1–13 to 1–6 victory gave Ballyhale Shamrocks their first Leinster club title.  The subsequent All-Ireland club final saw Ballyhale take on the famous Blackrock club from Cork.  Two first-half Ray Cummins goals gave ‘the Rockies’ the edge going into the second half and they won the game, only just, by 5–7 to 5–5.

In 1979 Ballyhale proved that their county championship victory in 1978 was not a fluke, however, they were put to the pin of their collar by Erin's Own.  The county final that year ended in a 0–14 apiece draw, however, Shamrocks made no mistake in the unfinished replay and won the game easily by 3–12 to 1–6.  There was no provincial success for the club on that occasion.

1980 saw Ballyhale attempt to capture a third county title in-a-row.  Muckalee-Ballyfoyle Rovers stood in their way in the county final, however, for the second consecutive year the game ended in a draw.  The replay was more conclusive as the Shamrocks powered to a 3–13 to 1–10 win and a third county title in-a-row.  For the second time in three years Ballyhale reached the final of the Leinster club championship, however, on this occasion they faced opposition from the Offaly champions.  Coolderry, however, lost out by 3–10 to 1–8 as the Shamrocks took their second Leinster club title.  Ballyhale's successful campaign continued all the way to the All-Ireland final where they played Cork champions St. Finbarr's.  On that occasion seven Fennelly brothers lined out against a star-studded Barr's team, captained by Jimmy Barry-Murphy.  Both teams were evenly matched and the first-half saw the sides level on five occasions.  Fourteen minutes into the second-half Ballyhale took a decisive lead when Liam Fennelly scored the crucial goal.  Jimmy Barry-Murphy scored a goal for St. Finbarr's with six minutes left, however, it was too little too late.  Ballyhale Shamrocks took their first All-Ireland club title.

Four-in-a-row proved beyond this great Ballyhale team as they were defeated in the county championship in 1981.

Championship dominance
After a brief hiatus Ballyhale Shamrocks were back in the county final again in 1982.  Reigning champions county, provincial and All-Ireland champions James Stephens provided the opposition on that occasion, however, they proved no problem for Ballyhale.  A 3–10 to 2–4 victory gave the Shamrocks their fourth county championship title.  The club was later defeated in the early stages of the provincial championship.

1983 allowed James Stephens a chance to gain revenge on Ballyhale as both sides lined out against each other in the county final again.  The result was similar with the Shamrocks having another convincing 2–14 to 1–8 victory.  It was an impressive fifth county championship title in six years.  Ballyhale later represented the county in the provincial championship and reached the final once again.  Kinnitty, the Offaly champs, were the opponents on that occasion.  A close game eventually saw Ballyhale claim the victory with a 3–6 to 0–9 score line.  Subsequent victories allowed the Shamrocks to qualify for the All-Ireland final where they lined out against Gort.  The game developed into a close affair, however, with just one minute left Gort were ahead by a point.  With the game entering the dying seconds a Dermot Fennelly point earned Ballyhale a 1–10 apiece draw and a replay.  The second game was a close one as well, however, a first-half Ger Fennelly goal gave the Shamrocks the edge.  The Kilkenny men hung on to win by 1–10 to 0–7. It was the club's second All-Ireland title.

1984 gave Ballyhale Shamrocks the chance to capture a second three in-a-row inside seven years.  All went to plan as the club reached another county final where St. Martin's were the opponents.  The final was a huge disappointment for the Fennelly-inspired club as St. Martin's win by seven points.

After defeat in 1984 Ballyhale Shamrocks compensated in 1985 with a 4–18 to 3–13 defeat of Glenmore to take another county title.  This victory was followed by defeats by Clara and Glenmore in the respective county finals of 1986 and 1987.

By 1988 Ballyhale Shamrocks were back on top.  A 2–15 to 0–4 thrashing of Thomastown in the county final gave the Shamrocks their seventh county title inside a decade.  The club later reached the Leinster final where they were defeated by Buffer's Alley.

In 1989 Ballyhale continued their dominance of the championship by reaching the county final again.  On that occasion Glenmore provided the opposition and a tense and close game developed.  After an exciting hour of hurling Ballyhale emerged victorious by the narrowest of margins with a 2–11 to 1–13 win.  It was a remarkable eight county championship title in eleven years.  The club had a relatively easy passage, culminating in the capturing of the Leinster title following a 2–11 to 0–7 victory over Cuala of Dublin.  The subsequent All-Ireland club final saw the Shamrocks line out against Ballybrown of Limerick.  Ballybrown led by six points before Ger Fennelly's twenty-fourth-minute goal got the Kilkenny men back on track.  At the interval the Limerick champs were still four points to the good, however, a second-half surge by Ballyhale gave them a 1–16 to 0–16 victory. It was the club's record-equalling third All-Ireland club title.

After surrendering their county title in 1990, Ballyhale Shamrocks were back in 1991.  That year the club added a ninth county championship title to their collection following a 3–16 to 1–8 win over St. Martin's.  The subsequent Leinster final day the Kilkenny men collapsed against Offaly champions Birr.  A 2–14 to 0–3 defeat brought the curtain down on the great Ballyhale team of the 1980s.

The club was relegated from the senior ranks in 1995, losing to St. Martin's in the relegation final. The following year they lost at the semi-final stage of the intermediate championship to O' Loughlin's. In 1997, the club returned to the senior ranks with an exciting final victory over Graiguenamanagh on a scoreline of 4–12 to 3–07 and has retained it senior status since then powered by strong underage teams that won the minor Roinn A and U16 Roinn A in 1997 and the Feile in 1998.

Success in the 2000s
After returning to senior ranks, the Shamrocks consolidated their position, they did make a couple of county semi-finals (in 1999 and 2000) but were generally frustrated in their efforts to regain the Tom Walsh trophy.

The break-through was partially achieved in 2005, after a successful league campaign the Shamrocks defeated St. Martin's in the championship quarter final and had a slightly flattering win against O'Loughlin's in the semi-final. After a fourteen-year absence they were back in the senior decider against reigning All-Ireland Senior Club Hurling Championship champions, James Stephens. Despite starting very brightly the Shamrocks could not match the experience and class of the city side. They were defeated on a scoreline of 1–18 to 2–12

2006 would prove to be the year when the undoubted potential of the current crop of hurlers would bear fruit, the league title was retained, the Fenians beaten in the final. Victory in the quarter final over Carrickshock in a pulsating game was followed by a semi-final win against another near neighbour, Dunamaggin. This set up the title decider against the champions of 2001 and 2003, O'Loughlin Gaels, the south Kilkenny club were victorious on a scoreline of 1–21 to 2–11 to take their tenth county championship title.

The Shamrocks then regained the provincial championship by defeating Birr in the final to take another Leinster club title. The semi-final against Toomevara proved to be an outstanding contest, the Tipperary and Munster champions racing into an early lead that they built up to a twelve-point margin at one stage in the first half. A vital goal by Eoin Reid just before half-time proving very valuable for the Shamrocks in their efforts to keep in touch. The second half saw Toomevara missing several early chances to extend their lead and when the Shamrocks finally got going they scored some incredible points, the vital score was a goal by James "Cha" Fitzpatrick with six minutes to go. The Shamrocks powered through on a scoreline of 2–21 to 3–14. The club had qualified for the All-Ireland final with Loughrea providing the opposition.  A new generation of hurlers, including James "Cha" Fitzpatrick, played a key role in that game and powered Ballyhale to their fourth All-Ireland club title.

In 2007 Ballyhale Shamrocks continued their winning ways with the club winning a second consecutive county title, before that, the hat-trick was completed in the league, with a comfortable victory over James Stephens. The championship quarter-final against dogged Dunnamaggin was a tight and tricky affair that only swung the Shamrocks way in the last seven minutes, mainly due to terrific individual performances from James "Cha" Fitzpatrick and Eamon Walsh at full-back. In the semi-final against James Stephens all was going according to the Shamrocks plan until a bad foot injury forced James "Cha" Fitzpatrick off and the remainder of the game was a fraught affair where James Stephens had chances to punish the Shamrocks but squandered them. After getting through to the final, the club had an ultimately easy 1–20 to 1–10 victory over St. Martin's, even without the injured Henry Shefflin and James "Cha" Fitzpatrick but the game was still up for grabs with ten minutes to go until the Shamrocks produced a scoring burst that killed off St. Martin's.

The injuries to the two All-Stars proved detrimental in the Leinster club campaign however, a narrow victory over Carlow champions Mount Leinster Rangers led to another clash with fellow Leinster kingpins Birr. The game was close throughout but the loss of two major players proved too hard to overcome for the Shamrocks and Birr went through to another Leinster club final.

In 2008, the Shamrocks have already retained the League title with a very impressive performance against James Stephens in the final on a scoreline of 5–19 to 0–13.

They have also overcome the intermediate champions of last year, Clara in the championship quarter final on a scoreline of 3–19 to 0–10. The Shamrocks defeated near neighbours, Carrickshock in the championship semi-final on a scoreline of 1–21 to 0–11, setting up a repeat of the 2005 final with old rivals James Stephens.  A close game ensued, however, at the full-time whistle Ballyhale were the winners by 2–11 to 0–12.  It was their third consecutive county title.

This 12th county victory allowed the team to compete in the Leinster club championship and victories over Rathdowney-Errill (Laois) and then Raharney (Westmeath) set up a re-match with defending champions Birr. The game was dominated by the Shamrocks for long spells, with their biggest lead nine points at one stage but a late rally by the Offaly champions briefly threatened but too much had been left to do. This 6th Leinster victory puts the Kilkenny champions in joint 2nd place in titles won.

The Club was defeated at the semi-final stage of the 2009 All Ireland club championship by a superior and devastating Portumna teams who went on to capture their third Club All Ireland in five years against De La Salle of Waterford.

2009
The Club has retained the Senior League trophy which was awarded to them by the County Board after their opponents James Stephens refused to fulfil the fixture.

The Club have equalled this year the long-standing record of Carrickshock by defeating James Stephens in the Kilkenny Senior Hurling Championship final by three points on a scoreline of 1–14 to 1–11. They had defeated Graigue-Ballyvallen in the quarter-final and then city side O' Loughlin's in the semi-final. This is a unique achievement for one parish as the previous four-in-a-row was not achieved under 'parish rule' in Kilkenny.

The Club has progressed to the final of the Leinster Senior Club Hurling Championship against Tullamore by defeating Wexford champions Oulart the Ballagh in Wexford Park (that went to extra time) on a scoreline of 2–20 to 1–21 in the quarter-final, and then overcoming Dublin champions Ballyboden St. Enda's on a scoreline of 4–18 to 0–18 in Nowlan Park in the semi-final.

The Club retained the Leinster title for the first time in their history with victory over Tullamore, a game moved to Tullamore after weather problems. This 7th title brings the Shamrocks level with Birr in the roll of honour for Leinster club titles.

The club have won through to their 6th Club All Ireland final by defeating Newtownshandrum on a score of 0–19 to 0–17, in a very tight, hard-fought contest on St. Valentine's Day in Thurles. This result meant a repeat of 2008 semi-final against Galway champions Portumna. The match was played on St. Patrick's Day in Croke Park. Ballyhale won 1–19 to 0–17 with Henry Shefflin hitting 9 points. The team was; J. Connolly; A. Cuddihy, A.Cummins, P. Holden; P.Shefflin, E. Walsh (capt.), B. Aylward; J. "Cha" Fitzpatrick, M. Fennelly; C. Fennelly, H. Shefflin, TJ Reid; E. Reid, P. Reid, D. Hoyne

2010
The Club won the Byrne Cup final, overcoming Mullinavat in the final (final played in Ballyhale) but failed to retain their League title, losing a close encounter 1–18 to 1–17 against James Stephens. They had been attempting to retain the trophy for a sixth year in a row.

The Club has qualified for a championship semi-final meeting with O'Loughlin's after defeating Dunamaggin in the quarter final on a scoreline of 1–19 to 0–09. The game was very tight and nervous for the first half and the scoreline of 0–09 (BS) – 0-07 (D) did not do justice to Dunamaggin's challenge. The five-in-a-row championship bid was halted at the semi-final stage, old rivals O' Loughlin's Gaels winning with a late goal after a tense game. The senior team missing the injured Henry Shefflin who had suffered a second serious knee injury in the All Ireland semi-final v Cork.

2011

The club regained the League title with a six-point victory over old foes, James Stephen's. The senior squad then won through to the County Final after a very tough schedule that paired them against neighbours Carrickshock in the quarter-final, it took a second match to separate the sides after Carrickshock needed a late free (converted by Ritchie Power) after Carrickshock had been in control for large parts of the match. In the replay the Shamrocks performance greatly improved and they finally shook off the challengers. It did not get any easier at the semi-final stage, with the beaten All Ireland club finalists waiting. The Shamrocks hurled well but were nearly unsettled by a late scoring burst from O'Loughlin's. The final matchup was the fourth meeting in six years with James Stephen's. The first day ended in a draw with both sides having to deal with the elements, the game played in a bitterly cold gale with driving rain throughout. The weather conditions for the replay were slightly improved, one of the main turning points in the match was an excellent 'solo' goal by top Village marksman, Eoin Larkin just before half-time. The other major talking point was the dismissal of inter-county colleagues, Colin Fennelly (second yellow) and Jackie Tyrell (red card) for an altercation ten minutes into the second half. The loss of Fennelly seemed to unsettle the Shamrocks more than the loss of Tyrell to James Stephens. The Village took over in the last ten minutes to record a comprehensive eight-point victory.

2012

The senior team were defeated in the final of the Byrne Cup by St. Martin's, conceding two goals in the second half while on top in general play. They were also defeated by Carrickshock in the League Final, a finely balanced game that was basically decided when our rivals scored the only goal of the game with about ten minutes remaining. In this years championship, Erin's Own, Castlecomer were beaten at the quarter-final stage on a scoreline of 3–16 to 1–16. the Club won through to its seventh final in eight years with a fine performance against annual semi-final competitors, O' Loughlin's. The scoreline was 1–17 to 2–10. Their opponents in the final were Dicksboro, who unseated the 2011 champions in a thrilling contest where the result was in doubt up to the final whistle.

In the 2012 County final, the club won their 14th title after an interesting match where the Shamrocks controlled from the start but spurned several goal chances and where Henry Shefflin also had two penalties saved. Dicksboro slowly came into the match but needed at least one goal to really put pressure on their opponents. After a goal attempt came back into play off the butt of the upright with seven minutes remaining, they never looked like winning. The Shamrocks saw out the game on a scoreline of 0–16 to 0–12.

Club honours

Hurling 
ADULT
All-Ireland Senior Club Hurling Championships: 9  
 1981, 1984, 1990, 2007, 2010, 2015, 2019, 2020, 2023
 Beaten finalists
 1978, 2022
Leinster Senior Club Hurling Championships: 12
 1978, 1980, 1983, 1989, 2006, 2008, 2009, 2014, 2018, 2019, 2021, 2022
 Beaten finalists
 1988, 1991
Kilkenny Senior Hurling Championships: 20
 1978, 1979, 1980, 1982, 1983, 1985, 1988, 1989, 1991, 2006, 2007, 2008, 2009, 2012, 2014, 2018, 2019, 2020, 2021, 2022
 Beaten finalists - 6
 1984, 1986, 1987, 2005, 2011, 2016
Kilkenny Senior Hurling Leagues: 8
 1992, 2005 (awarded final), 2006, 2007, 2008, 2009 (awarded final), 2011, 2016
 Beaten finalists 2
 2010, 2012
Kilkenny Senior League – Shield: 2
 2013, 2014
James McKeogh Memorial Tournament: 1
 2010
Byrne Cup (Senior & Intermediate teams): 4
 1989, 1991, 2004, 2010, 2018
Aylward Cup (Senior & Intermediate teams): 1
 2009
Kilkenny Intermediate Hurling Championships: 2
 1974, 1997
Kilkenny Junior Hurling Championship: 1
 1973
Southern Junior Championships: 2
 1973, 1983
County Final – Sp. Junior A: 2
 1982, 2013
Junior A – League County Final: 1
 2008
Southern – Junior A Championships: 6
 1982, 1990, 1992, 1999, 2003, 2013
Southern – Junior A Leagues: 6
 1997, 2000, 2002, 2004, 2007, 2008
3rd Team League / Junior B: 1
 2017
Roinn A – U21 Championships: 9
 1972, 1973, 1974, 2003, 2004, 2005, 2006, 2017, 2018.
Roinn A – Southern U21 Championships: 16
 1967, 1970 (as Ballyhale), 1972, 1973, 1974, 1976, 1977, 1979, 1989, 1990, 2003, 2004, 2005, 2006, 2007, 2017.
Roinn B – Southern U21 Championship: 1
 1998

UNDERAGE
Roinn A – Minor Championships: 5
 1965, 1967 (as Ballyhale), 1976, 1997, 2016.
 Beaten finalists- 5
 1966, 1971 (as Ballyhale), 1999, 2000, 2001
Roinn A – Minor Leagues: 2
 2000, 2002
Roinn A – Southern Minor Championships: 7
 1965, 1966, 1967, 1971 (as Ballyhale), 1976, 1997, 1999
Roinn B – Minor Championship: 1
 1982
Roinn B – Southern Minor Championships: 4
 1982, 1987, 1988, 1994,
Roinn A – U16 Championship: 1
 1997
Roinn B – U16 Championship: 3
 1995, 2011, 2016
Division I – U16 Leagues: 2
 1974, 2000
Division II – U16 League: 1
 1995
Under-15 Roinn C League (13 A Side)
 2019Paddy Grace Féile nGael – U14 final: 1
 1998Roinn A – U14 Championship: 1
 1997Roinn B – U14 Championship: 2
 1995, 2012Roinn B – U14 Shield: 1
 2010Roinn C – U14 Championship: 1
 2008Féile na nGael Division 1: 1998

 Football ADULTKilkenny Senior Football Championships: 3
 1979, 1980, 1982
 1994 (Runner up)Kilkenny Intermediate Football Championship: 1
 1992
 2013 (Runner up)Intermediate League Final: 2
 2003, 2013Junior Championships: 5
 1975, 1991, 2002, 2008, 2012Southern Junior Championships: 3
 1975, 1991, 2002UNDERAGERoinn B – Minor Championships: 1
 1982Roinn A – Southern Minor Championships: 1
 1976Roinn B – Southern Minor Championships: 2
 1982, 1999Roinn D – U16 Championship: 1
 2005Roinn A – U14 Championship: 1
 1998

Player honours

All-Ireland medal winnersSenior Dexter Aylward – 1922
 Jimmy Walsh – 1932, 1933, 1935, 1939
 Bill Walsh – 1947 (sub), 1957
 Denis Heaslip – 1957, 1963
 Pat Carroll – 1967 (sub)
 Ger Fennelly – (5) 1974 (sub), 1975 (sub), 1979, 1982, 1983
 Kevin Fennelly – (2) 1975, 1979 (both as sub)
 Richie Reid – (1) 1979
 Frank Holohan – (2) 1982, 1983 (both as sub)
 Liam Fennelly – (3) 1982, 1983, 1992
 Paul Phelan – (2) 1992, 1993 (both as sub)
 Henry Shefflin – (10) 2000, 2002, 2003, 2006, 2007, 2008, 2009, 2011, 2012, 2014
 Aidan Cummins – (3) 2000, 2002, 2003 (all as sub)
 James "Cha" Fitzpatrick – (5) 2006, 2007, 2008, 2009, 2011 (sub)
 Eoin Reid – (4) 2006, 2007, 2008, 2009 (all as sub)
 Michael Fennelly – (8) 2006 (sub), 2007, 2008 (sub), 2009, 2011, 2012, 2014, 2015
 T. J. Reid – (7) 2007 (sub), 2008, 2009, 2011, 2012, 2014, 2015 
 Colin Fennelly – (4) 2011, 2012, 2014, 2015
 Joey Holden – (2) 2014 (played in drawn game), 2015
 Richie Reid – (2) 2014, 2015 (unused sub)IntermediateMichael Hoyne – 1973
Maurice Mason – 1973
Patrick Holden – 1973Junior Denis Heaslip – 1956U21 Kevin Fennelly – 1974, 1975
 Ger Fennelly – 1974, 1975
 Sean Reid – 1974 (sub)
 Ritchie Reid – 1975 (sub), 1977
 Brendan Fennelly – 1977
 Tommy Phelan – 1984
 Tommy Shefflin – 1990
 Jimmy Lawlor – 1990
 Brendan Mason – 1990
 Henry Shefflin – 1999
 Aidan Cummins – 1999
 Bob Aylward – 1999
 James "Cha" Fitzpatrick – 2004, 2006
 Michael Fennelly – 2004, 2006
 Padraig Holden – 2004
 Keith Nolan – 2004
 Eoin Reid – 2004
 Eamon Walsh- 2006
 Mark Aylward-2006
 T. J. Reid – 2006, 2008
 Colin Fennelly – 2008Minor Donal Gorey – 1950 
 Maurice Aylward – 1961, 1962 
 Kevin Fennelly – 1972, 1973 (sub)
 Ger Fennelly – 1972
 Seán Fennelly – 1977
 Tommy Shefflin – 1988
 John Shefflin – 1990
 Padraig Holden – 2002
 Keith Nolan – 2002
 Eoin Reid – 2002
 James "Cha" Fitzpatrick – 2002, 2003
 Michael Fennelly – 2003
 Alan Cuddihy – 2008
 Richard Reid – 2010
 Ronan Corcoran – 2014
 Darren Mullen – 2014

All-Ireland winning captainsSenior Ger Fennelly – 1979
 Liam Fennelly – 1983, 1992,
 Henry Shefflin – 2007
 James "Cha" Fitzpatrick – 2008
 Michael Fennelly – 2009
 Joseph Holden – 2015U21 Kevin Fennelly – 1974
 Ger Fennelly – 1975
 James "Cha" Fitzpatrick – 2004
 Michael Fennelly – 2006Minor Seán Fennelly – 1977

Player of the yearSenior 
 Henry Shefflin – (3) 2002, 2006, 2012
 Michael Fennelly – (1) 2011
 TJ Reid – (1) 2015Young James "Cha" Fitzpatrick – 2006
 Adrian Mullen – 2019
 Eoin Cody - 2020, 2021

Man of the match – Senior All-Ireland
 Henry Shefflin – (1) 2002 
 Michael Fennelly – (1) 2015

All-Stars
 Total = 32'''
 Henry Shefflin – (11) 2000, 2002, 2003, 2004, 2005, 2006, 2007, 2008, 2009, 2011, 2012
 T. J. Reid – (6) 2012, 2014, 2015, 2019, 2020, 2022
 Liam Fennelly – (4) 1983, 1985, 1987, 1992
 James "Cha" Fitzpatrick – (3) 2006, 2007, 2008
 Michael Fennelly – (3) 2010, 2011, 2015
 Colin Fennelly – (2) 2014, 2019
 Ger Fennelly – (1) 1983
 Joseph Holden – (1) 2015
 Adrian Mullen – (1) 2022

Senior panel

Management team – 2020

Notable hurlers

Managerial history

References

External links

Official
Club website

Unofficial
Ballyhale Shamrocks
Kilkenny GAA Bible

Positions held

Gaelic games clubs in County Kilkenny
Hurling clubs in County Kilkenny